Alekos Sofianidis (3 August 1937 – 6 July 2010) was a Turkish-born Greek professional footballer who played as a left back and a later manager.

Club career
Born in the Beyoğlu district of Istanbul Province, Sofianidis began his career at Beyoğluspor, based in the city of Istanbul. Fast and dynamic, he played on the left wing of the football team's attack and attracted the interest of the big football teams of Istanbul. He was transferred to Beşiktaş in 1948 and in the period 1950 he won with the team the then so-called Istanbul league. A great sports fan and lover of sports, he also participated in the Besiktas basketball team, but giving priority to his football obligations. The events of the September 1955 and the difficult period that followed for the Hellenism of Istanbul, affected deeply Sofianidis who started thinking of relocating to his Greece. As a result, he began to correspond with the agent of AEK Athens, Giorgos Tranopoulos with the exclusive subject of concern, to transfer him to the club of Athens.

On Saturday 17 January 1959, AEK submitted the sport's card of Sofianidis to the HFF and at the same time started negotiating with the TFF for the release of the player, so he can participate in the matches of the yellow-blacks. Sofianidis played only in friendly matches until the agreement with the Turks was reached and he was integrated into the team's roster in 1959 season, which coincided with the start of the first championship national division in Greek football. The arrival of Jenő Csaknády on the bench of AEK in 1962 also brought about a change of position for Sofianidis, since the Hungarian-German coach relocated him to the position of left wing-back, where Sofianidis spent the rest of his career standing out as one of the best footballers to ever play that position. In 1968, when AEK played against Fenerbahçe in the Balkans Cup final in 1968, Sofianidis did not accompany his club to Istanbul as he would have been liable for arrest by the Turkish authorities for not fulfill his military obligations. With the shirt of AEK he won 2 Championships, as well as the 2 Greek Cups, while he was a key member of the squad that reached the quarter-finals of the European Cup in 1969.

In the summer of 1969 he left AEK and played for the Panachaiki for a season, before his retirement.

International career
Sofianidis represented the Turkey B, in a friendly 1–0 win over Egypt on 20 May 1957.

Sofianidis was capped by Greece seven times. He played his first national game on 15 November 1958 against Yugoslavia. His last game for Greece was against Finland on 10 May 1967.

Managerial career
Sofianidis coached several Greek youth teams following his retirement from football in 1970. He was appointed Greece manager in 1988. His first game was against Hungary (winning 3–0) on 15 November 1988. Greece played 7 times with Sofianidis as their manager, winning 3, drawing 1, and losing 3. He was also manager during the infamous friendly match between Greece and Turkey on 29 March 1989, losing 1–0. This was his last game with the national team.

Personal life
Sofianidis was a gymnastics teacher by profession. He had a pool's agency in Athens on Agios Meletios Street. He died on 10 July 2010 after a long battle with cancer at age 73.

Honours

Besiktas
Istanbul Football League: 1949–50

AEK Athens
Alpha Ethniki: 1962–63, 1967–68
Greek Cup: 1963–64, 1965–66

References

External links

TFF Profile
NFT Profile

1933 births
2010 deaths
Greek footballers
Greece international footballers
Turkish footballers
Turkey B international footballers
Turkish people of Greek descent
Beyoğlu SK footballers
Beşiktaş J.K. footballers
AEK Athens F.C. players
Panachaiki F.C. players
Footballers from Istanbul
Super League Greece players
Süper Lig players
Constantinopolitan Greeks
Association football defenders
Panelefsiniakos F.C. managers
Turkish football managers
Atromitos F.C. managers
Turkish expatriate football managers
People from Beyoğlu